Shameen may refer to:
 Shamian Island in Guangzhou, China
 Shameen a character in the Quest for Glory series of adventure games